Zelbio is a comune (municipality) in the Province of Como in the Italian region Lombardy, located about  north of Milan and about  northeast of Como.

Zelbio borders the following municipalities: Bellagio, Lezzeno, Nesso, Sormano, Veleso.

Demographic evolution

References

External links
 www.comune.zelbio.co.it

Cities and towns in Lombardy